Coast were a Scottish alternative rock band active between 1991 and 1999. The band achieved initial success with singles including "Now That You Know Me" but failed to translate their success beyond the debut album.

Discography

Singles
Head Light, B-sides: "Soundhole" "Blue Green" 1991
"Polly's Domain", B-side "Sleepy"	1995
"Slugs", B-side "Shag Wild" 1995
"Do It Now", B-side "It's Not Too Late" 1996
"Now That You Know Me", B-side "Tender Cage 1996

Album
Big Jet Rising 1997

References

Scottish alternative rock groups